The Space Competitiveness Index (SCI) is a self-financed, independently researched, annual report that compares and ranks how countries invest in and benefit from space industry. The report has been published annually since 2008 by Futron Corporation, a U.S. consulting firm. The report has grown over the years from the top 10 leading space markets in 2008 to 15 in 2012. While the full reports are available for purchase, the executive summary is distributed freely.

Overview 
Traditionally, the report included the top 10 leading markets which included Brazil, Canada, China, Europe, India, Israel, Japan, Russia, South Korea, and the United States. In the 2012, the report introduced 5 more countries which include Argentina, Australia, Iran, South Africa, and Ukraine. The report treats Europe as integrated whole.

A set of over 40 metrics that have the greatest economic determinants are compiled for each entity individually. The metrics were separated into three major areas:
 Government
 Human Capital
 Industry

2008 SCI 
The 2008 report was the first edition of the Space Competitiveness Index. The report ranked the top 10 global space participant countries across over 40 greatest economic determinants metrics.

Total Aggregate Scores by Country:

2009 SCI 
The second edition of the report was able to contrast with the first edition. While the United States still led the index, they declined marginally based on increase by other countries.

Total Aggregate Scores by Country:

2010 SCI 
The 3rd edition continued to show decline from the dominant players and increase from the smaller countries. The report found that countries such as the U.S. and Canada has its technological leadership buoyed by the contribution of the industrial sector, which effectively markets, uses, and sells technology assets to government and commercial clients worldwide. Conversely, other countries such as China do not effectively leverage its high space technology achievement capability. some of the factors that influence that are government commercial policy and a limited private-sector industrial activity.

Total Aggregate Scores by Country:

2011 SCI 

In the 2011, while global activity overall increase, the dominant players continued to decrease for the fourth straight year as middle-tier nations ascend.

2012 SCI 

The 2012 report marks the fifth anniversary edition of the study, which called for a half-decade review of international space trends based on quantitative and qualitative data. In the 2012 report, in addition to the 10 traditional leading markets, Futron included a second tier for emerging space leaders. The new tier, which is evaluate alongside the 10 original markets include Argentina, Australia, Iran, South Africa, and Ukraine. Brazil being surpassed by Australia. While the US remains the overall leader in space competitiveness its relative position has fallen for the fifth straight year as other countries enhance their capabilities. In contrast, other countries such as China, Japan, Russia and India have improved their space competitiveness by 41 percent, 37, 11 and 10 percent respectively since the first edition of the Space Competitiveness Index.

Total Aggregate Scores by Country:

References

External links 
 2012 Space Competitiveness Index Executive Summary
 2011 Space Competitiveness Index Executive Summary
 2010 Space Competitiveness Index Executive Summary
 2009 Space Competitiveness Index Executive Summary
 2008 Space Competitiveness Index Executive Summary

International rankings